Koru is an underground rapid transit station and the western terminus of the M2 line of the Ankara Metro. The station is located along Ankaralılar Avenue within Ahmet Taner Kışlalı Park and was opened on 13 March 2014. Connections to EGO Bus service is available on Şeyh Mucibur Rahman Boulevard. This station is secondary depot station in Ankara Metro(main depot station located at Macunköy station). Trains are added to and removed from the system from this station. The addition/removal process is done with a railway switch that connects to the mainline from the yard lines close to the station.

References

External links
EGO Ankara - Official website
Ankaray - Official website

Railway stations opened in 2014
Ankara metro stations
2014 establishments in Turkey